The 2012–13 network television schedule for the four major Brazilian Portuguese commercial broadcast networks in Brazil covers primetime hours from March 2012 to February 2013.

The schedule is followed by a list per network of returning series, new series or telenovelas (soap operas), and series canceled after the 2011–12 season.

Legend

Schedule
 New series are highlighted in bold.
 All times are in Brasília time. Add one hour for Atlantic islands time, subtract one hour for Amazon time and two hours for Acre time.
 Note: From July 27 to August 12, 2014 all Rede Record primetime programming was pre-empted for coverage of 2012 Summer Olympics.

 Lime indicates the #1 most watched program of the season.
 Yellow indicates the top-10 most watched programs of the season.
 Cyan indicates the top-20 most watched programs of the season.
 Magenta indicates the top-30 most watched programs of the season.
 Orange indicates the top-40 most watched programs of the season.
 Silver indicates the top-50 most watched programs of the season.

Sunday

Monday

Tuesday

Wednesday

Thursday

Friday

Saturday

References

Television in Brazil
2012 in Brazilian television
2013 in Brazilian television
Brazilian television schedules